Pluteus glaucus is a  mushroom in the family Pluteaceae.

Chemistry
0.28% psilocybin, 0.12% psilocin (Stijve and de Meijer 1993).

See also
List of Pluteus species
List of Psilocybin mushrooms

References

Fungi described in 1962
Fungi of Sweden
glaucus
Psychoactive fungi
Psychedelic tryptamine carriers
Taxa named by Rolf Singer